Lenus was a Celtic healing god worshipped mainly in eastern Gaul, where he was almost always identified with the Roman god Mars.

Name 
The theonym Lenos may derive from a stem lēno-, which could mean 'wood, bocage' (cf. Welsh llwyn 'bush, grave, shrub').

Cult 
He was an important god of the Treveri tribe, who had large sanctuaries at medicinal springs at Trier and the Martberg by Pommern in what is now Germany. Two dedications to him are also known from southwestern Britain (Chedworth and Caerwent). Edith Wightman characterizes him as “one of the best examples of a Teutates, or god of the people, equated with Mars—protector of the tribe in battle, but also [...] bestower of health and general good fortune” (p. 211). His sanctuary ‘Am Irminenwingert’ at Trier had a large temple, baths, smaller shrines and a theatre; that on the Martberg also included a large variety of buildings, probably including rooms for health-seeking pilgrims to stay. Despite his associations with healing, Lenus Mars is depicted classically as a warrior with Corinthian helmet in a bronze statuette from the Martberg.

His name most often appears in inscriptions as ‘Lenus Mars’, rather than ‘Mars Lenus’ as would be expected from other most syncretized names. At Trier, Lenus Mars's divine partners were the Celtic goddess Ancamna and the Roman Victoria, as well as the Xulsigiae, who are perhaps water nymphs. An inscription from Kaul in Luxembourg appears to invoke Lenus Mars ‘Veraudunus’ along with the Celtic goddess Inciona.

Lenus was not the only Celtic god identified with Mars by the Treveri; others, such as Iovantucarus (apparently a protector of youth), Intarabus, Camulos, and Loucetios were identified with Mars and perhaps, by extension, with Lenus. His name occasionally appears as ‘Mars Laenus’; the more usual form ‘Lenus Mars’ is accompanied by the epithets Arterancus and Exsobinus on one inscription each.

In Britain, Mars Lenus may have been identified with Ocelus Vellaunus, on the evidence of this inscription on the base of a statue:

DEO MARTI LENO SIVE OCELO VELLAVN ET NVM AVG M NONIVS ROMANVS OB IMMVNITAT COLLEGNI D D S D GLABRIONE ET HOMVLO COS X K SEPT
To the god Mars Lenus or Ocelus Vellaunus and to the Numen of the Augustus, Marcus Nonius Romanus dedicated this from the privilege of the college during the consulship of Glabrio and Homulus ten days before the Calends of September.

References

Bibliography

External links
 Photograph of the Treveran Mars, by Paul Garland

Gaulish gods
Health gods
Martian deities